Lake Howard is an unincorporated community in DeKalb County, Alabama, United States, located northeast of Fort Payne and south of Valley Head.

References

Unincorporated communities in DeKalb County, Alabama
Unincorporated communities in Alabama